In enzymology, a cinnamate beta-D-glucosyltransferase is an enzyme that catalyzes the chemical reaction

UDP-glucose + trans-cinnamate  UDP + trans-cinnamoyl beta-D-glucoside

Thus, the two substrates of this enzyme are UDP-glucose and trans-cinnamate, whereas its two products are UDP and trans-cinnamoyl beta-D-glucoside.

This enzyme belongs to the family of glycosyltransferases, specifically the hexosyltransferases.  The systematic name of this enzyme class is UDP-glucose:trans-cinnamate beta-D-glucosyltransferase. Other names in common use include uridine diphosphoglucose-cinnamate glucosyltransferase, and UDPG:t-cinnamate glucosyltransferase.

References

 

EC 2.4.1
Enzymes of unknown structure